Schwarzwald-Baar is a Landkreis (district) in the south of Baden-Württemberg, Germany. Neighboring districts are (from north clockwise) Ortenaukreis, Rottweil, Tuttlingen, Constance, the Swiss canton of Schaffhausen, and the districts Waldshut, Breisgau-Hochschwarzwald and Emmendingen.

History
The district was created in 1973, when the districts of Donaueschingen and Villingen were merged.

Geography
The district got its name from the two predominant landscapes in the district.  The Black Forest (Schwarzwald), and the Baar, the foothills between the Black Forest and the Swabian Alb. Both the Danube River and the Neckar River have their origins in the Schwarzwald and Baar district.

Coat of arms

The coat of arms is modeled after the two coat of arms of the cities of Villingen and Schwenningen. Villingen had a horizontally divided blue-and-white arms, while Schwenningen had a vertically divided blue-and-white arms. Combining both divisions gives the four fields. The eagle in the top-left quarter is taken from the coat of arms of the city of Villingen, and derives from the Zähringen family who ruled that city in the 13th century.

Cities and towns

References

External links

Official website (German)

 
Freiburg (region)
Districts of Baden-Württemberg